The 1922 Newbury by-election was held on 10 June 1922.  The by-election was held due to the resignation of the incumbent Coalition Conservative MP, William Mount.  It was won by the Coalition Conservative candidate Howard Clifton Brown.

References

1922 elections in the United Kingdom
1922 in England
20th century in Berkshire
Newbury, Berkshire
By-elections to the Parliament of the United Kingdom in Berkshire constituencies
Unopposed by-elections to the Parliament of the United Kingdom (need citation)